The hypoglossal nucleus is a cranial nerve nucleus, found within the medulla. Being a motor nucleus, it is close to the midline. In the open medulla, it is visible as what is known as the hypoglossal trigone, a raised area (medial to the vagal trigone) protruding slightly into the fourth ventricle.

The hypoglossal nucleus is located between the dorsal motor nucleus of the vagus and the midline of the medulla. Axons from the hypoglossal nucleus pass anteriorly through the medulla forming the hypoglossal nerve which exits between the pyramid and olive in a groove called the anterolateral sulcus.

See also
 Hypoglossal nerve

Additional images

External links
 
 
 

Cranial nerve nuclei